Balbina may refer to:

People
 Saint Balbina
 Balbina Gutierrez (born 1929), French actress
 Balbina Herrera (born 1954 or 1955), Panamanian politician
 Balbina Steffenone (1825–1896), 19th-century soprano

Places
 Balbina District in the municipality of Presidente Figueiredo in the Brazilian state of Amazonas
 Balbina Dam in Brazil

See also
 Balbín, surname